Pseudocalotes floweri, commonly known as Thai false bloodsucker or Flower's forest agamid, is a species of agamid lizard. It is found in Thailand, Cambodia, and Vietnam.

References

Pseudocalotes
Reptiles of Thailand
Reptiles of Cambodia
Reptiles of Vietnam
Reptiles described in 1912
Taxa named by George Albert Boulenger